Sirr Al-Khatim Al-Khalifa Al-Hassan (1 January 1919 – 18 February 2006) was a Sudanese politician, ambassador and an elite educator, who served as the 5th Prime Minister of Sudan. He was famous for his great legacy in education and founding prints for Ministry of Education in Sudan, and as the executive Prime Minister in the October Regime.

Early life and education
Al-Khalifa was born in Ed Dueim to Al-Khalifa Hassan Ahmed and Nafisa Al-Fakki Alabead. Descending from the Al Jalain tribe, his father migrated from Shendi to Ed Dueim and was appointed as khalifa of Al-Khatmiya.

In the early 1920s he attained his primary education at Ed Dueim Rural School and Berber Intermediate School. In 1937 he graduated from Gordon Memorial College studying Teachers Education. Al-Khalifa became a teacher at Bakht Arrida from 1938 till 1944, until he moved to Great Britain to continue his education.

In 1944 Al-Khalifa furthered his education by attending Exeter College, University of Oxford. In 1946 he returned to Sudan to resume his teaching job at Bakht Arrida.

Trip to South Sudan
In 1950, after the abandonment of the Southern Policy, a colonial policy that isolated Southern Sudan from education and economic development, Al-Khalifa was appointed as a Provincial Education Officer at Equatoria Province in Juba. After seven years of success at the job, he was promoted to become Assistant Director of Education for Southern Provinces, the highest educational position in the region. During this time, he increased the number of schools and introduced the Arabic language in the region. Spending 10 years in South Sudan, spreading education and relating to the once-totally-closed South, he became a very favorable and respected character in the whole of Sudan, South and North.

Return to North Sudan
In 1962, Al-Khalifa was appointed as a dean of Khartoum Technical Institute (now Sudan University of Science and Technology). He spent two years at the job, and was nicknamed "Father of Technical Education" in Sudan, since he devoted great effort and time for this newly established technical school.

1964 Revolution and political career debut
In 1964, the Abbud regime was facing numerous instabilities that led to a major strike from the different working sectors of the society. The strike, known as the October Revolution, led to rioting and numerous deaths and forced President Abbud to dissolve the government and prepare for civilian rule.

Al-Khalifa was nominated by the Umma Party as prime minister for a transitional government to prepare for civilian rule.  Many agreed upon the nominee, others including the Sudanese Communist Party (SCP) strongly disagreed due to his political inexperience and their nominees including Abdin Ismail and Jaafar Karrar. After several meetings between the different parties, Al-Khalifa was appointed as prime minister for the transitional government.

The Al-Khalifa regime was very eager to address, tackle and find peaceful solutions for the southern problem.  With party members holding few positions, Southern politicians were allowed positions that were deemed as Northern. Clement Mboro became the first Southern to hold the position of Minister of Interior.

1965 Round Table Conference
Al-Khalifa called upon establishing the Round Table Conference with the presence of 24 Southern politicians and 18 Northern party representatives to address the problem of the South. The conference was originally scheduled in Juba between 16–29 March 1965; however, several burnings and rampages in Juba signaled the migration of the conference to Khartoum.

However, the conference reached a deadlock and was concluded with the establishment of Twelve-Men Committee, consisting of the participating political parties. Al-Khalifa was forced to resign and the government promised to schedule elections by June 1965. With a rushed elections conducted in the North excluding the South for security reasons, this ended the transitional government of Al-Khalifa and started the second democratic phase of Sudan under Mohamed Ahmed Mahjub.

Diplomatic break from politics
Al-Khalifa was appointed as ambassador to Italy in 1966. In March 1968, he was transferred to become ambassador to Britain. On 25 May 1969, when Gaafar Nimeiry seized power, Al-Khalifa was bluntly informed about his end of service and stripped of his diplomatic passport. He had to report immediately to Khartoum. Some believe that this blunt telex was a reply from Babiker Awadallah, former chief justice and the new prime minister, and Nimeiry’s regime to Al-Khalifa’s betrayal of the October Revolution by rushing the 1965 elections thus handing power to Umma-PDP parties. After performing the diplomatic farewell to the Queen, Al-Khalifa returned to Khartoum in the beginning of June 1969.

Later life
In 1973, Nimeiry appointed Al-Khalifa as Minister of Education. He assumed this position for two years, when he was appointed in 1982 as President Advisor on Educational Affairs until the end of Nimeiry’s era in 1985.

The day after his death, Al-Khalifa's burial at Al-Bakri Cemetery on 19 February 2006, was attended by thousands of his colleagues, politicians, educators and students.

Trivia
 Succeeded by his son Hassan (named after his father), and four daughters Nafisa (named after his mother), Sulafa, Sara and Sawsan
 He inaugurated and was the first to pitch a ball in Al Merreikh Stadium in 1965.
 He was a fan of Ahmed Al-Mustafa, post Haqeeba singer 
 He was one of the authors of the famous geography books in Sudan primary school syllabus, Sobol Kasb Al-ayash fe es Sudan, (Means of earning a living in Sudan). This book explored the different regions of Sudan, introducing the dialects and customs of each region.

References

External links
Sudan Vision Daily News

1919 births
2006 deaths
People from White Nile (state)
National Umma Party politicians
Presidents of Sudan
University of Khartoum alumni
Alumni of Exeter College, Oxford
Ambassadors of Sudan to Italy
Ambassadors of Sudan to the United Kingdom
Sudanese educators
Prime Ministers of Sudan
Ja'alin tribe
20th-century Sudanese politicians
20th-century diplomats
Sudanese expatriates in the United Kingdom
Education ministers of Sudan